The Crisco Disco was a New York City discotheque notable in the history of modern dance, LGBT and nightclub cultures.

The venue was an important gay club located at 15th Street and 10th Avenue in the "Meatpacking District", a neighborhood in Manhattan that runs roughly from West 14th Street south to Gansevoort Street, and from the Hudson River east to Hudson Street.

It operated from the 1970s to the 1980s during the disco era, and it has been compared in importance to other NYC clubs such as Paradise Garage. In 2015, Michael Musto listed Crisco Disco as one of the eight "...edgiest [NYC venues] that shall never be recaptured." The club had a large DJ booth where DJs would mix records for the dancers. As a DJ booth, the club constructed a mock, giant vintage can of Crisco shortening. According to Drew Sawyer, in the 1970s, cans of Crisco were "...so synonymous with gay sex [(it was used as a lubricant by gay men who engaged in fisting)] that discos and bars around the world took on the name, such as Crisco Disco in New York City, one of the premiere clubs during the 1970s and early 1980s."

A 1998 book entitled Gay Macho: The Life and Death of the Homosexual Clone states that "many circuit bars, discos, and sex clubs had names that evoked sexual experience", including "Cockring, a popular nonmembership dance club". Bill Brewster's history of DJ culture states that in New York City clubs such as Crisco Disco, Mineshaft and Anvil, "...dancing took second place to sex".

See also
 LGBT culture in New York City

References

1970s establishments in New York City
1980s disestablishments in New York (state)
1980s in Manhattan
Defunct LGBT drinking establishments in New York City
Defunct LGBT nightclubs in New York (state)
Electronic dance music venues
Gay culture in New York (state)
Meatpacking District, Manhattan
Nightclubs in Manhattan